is a railway station in the town of Marumori, Miyagi Prefecture, Japan, operated by the third-sector railway operator AbukumaExpress.

Lines

Station layout
The station has one side platform serving a single bi-directional track. The station building is an octagonal structure. The station is unattended.

Adjacent stations

History
Abukuma Station opened on July 1, 1988.

Surrounding area
There are no villages or houses around the station. The station building sells tickets for the adjacent Abukuma Line's riverport, from where tourist ships depart between April and November.
 Abukuma River

See also
 List of Railway Stations in Japan

External links

  

Railway stations in Miyagi Prefecture
Abukuma Express Line
Railway stations in Japan opened in 1988
Marumori, Miyagi